Ludvig Bergh (9 January 1865 – 22 October 1924) was a Norwegian military officer, singer, actor and theatre director. He made his concert debut in Copenhagen in 1890. He worked as an actor in Christiania at the Carl Johan Theater, Christiania Theater, and from 1898 to 1908 at Nationaltheatret. He was chairman of the Norwegian Actors' Equity Association from 1903 to 1904. He was theatre director of the Bergen theatre Den Nationale Scene from 1909 to 1924.

References

1865 births
1924 deaths
Male actors from Oslo
Norwegian male stage actors
Norwegian theatre directors
Norwegian military personnel
19th-century Norwegian male singers